Prosopocera signatifrons is a species of beetle in the family Cerambycidae. It was described by Duvivier in 1891. It is known from Ghana, Togo, and the Democratic Republic of the Congo.

References

Prosopocerini
Beetles described in 1891